The First Congregational Church in Pueblo, Colorado is a Romanesque Revival style church building constructed in 1889.  The building designed by Fred A. Hale and constructed in 1889 with Manitou sandstone includes a bell tower. It was added to the National Register of Historic Places in 1985.

References

External links

Churches completed in 1889
Towers completed in 1889
Churches on the National Register of Historic Places in Colorado
Romanesque Revival church buildings in Colorado
19th-century churches in the United States
Churches in Pueblo, Colorado
Bell towers in the United States
National Register of Historic Places in Pueblo, Colorado